Alberts Lake is a glacial lake approximately  north-east of Bakers Narrows which drains into Thompson Lake. It is part of the Nelson River watershed, in the Hudson Bay drainage basin in Northern Manitoba, Canada.

Description
The lakes sits in Churchill River Upland portion of the Midwestern Canadian Shield forests and is surrounded by mixed forest with stands of black spruce, white spruce, jack pine, and trembling aspen. The shoreline is characterized by steeply sloping irregular rock ridges and poorly drained areas of muskeg. The lake contains burbot, lake whitefish, northern pike, walleye, and yellow perch. The lake is part of the well-known Mistik Creek Canoe route, and has portages to Leo Lake in the south and Naosap Mud Lake to the north.

Name
The lake was named after Peter Albert, a prospector in the area. The name was officially adopted in 1941.

Canoe route
The route begins and ends at Bakers Narrows and from Alberts Lake there are portages north to Naosap Mud Lake and south to Leo Lake.

See also
List of lakes of Manitoba

References

Lakes of Northern Manitoba
Glacial lakes of Manitoba